Lucie Blachet (1828–1907), was a Dutch photographer.  She was one of the first female photographers in the Netherlands.

She married the Dutch photographer Jacobus van Koningsveld and took over his studio in The Hague after his death in 1866.

References 

1828 births
1907 deaths
19th-century Dutch photographers
19th-century women photographers